Dogofry may refer to:

Dogofry, Koulikoro
Dogofry, Ségou